Akani may refer to
Akani Simbine (born 1993), South African sprinter 
Akani Songsermsawad (born 1995), Thai snooker player
Aqa Jakandi, a village in Iran